Castelo de Montel is a castle in Portugal.  It is classified by IGESPAR as a Site of Public Interest.

References 

Castles in Portugal